Trancid is a HD2 dance/electronic music station and one of seven Dance-formatted HD2 stations launched by Clear Channel Communications through their Format Lab, a new division set up to expand music formats over their HD2 subcarriers in 2006 up until its elimination in 2008. The channel was relaunched in 2011 as part of iHeartRadio, the successor to the Format Lab.

History
Trancid was launched on March 31, 2006 over the subcarrier channel of Top 40 Mainstream WAKS/Cleveland, Ohio and offered a playlist that is mostly made up of current trance, techno, electronic and dance tracks, all commercial-free and jockless 24/7. It also expanded the format to sister station KIKI-FM/Honolulu as well. In June 2008, the format was eliminated and its music was cominbed into the Club Phusion format.

After a nearly 3-year absence, Clear Channel relaunched Trancid, this time a part of iHeartRadio, on August 5, 2011. With this revival came a stable of well known names from the world of trance and electronic dance music being added to its programming lineup, including Paul Van Dyk, Bruce Cullen and Matt Darey. In addition, Trancid plans to also feature music sets and specialty programs.

References

External links

Electronic dance music radio stations
HD Radio
IHeartRadio digital channels
Radio stations established in 2008